F. Eugene Tubbs (July 31, 1935 – July 4, 1978) was an American politician. He served as a Republican member for the 45th and 72nd district of the Florida House of Representatives.

Tubbs was born in Dania Beach, Florida, the son of Margaret Tubbs. Tubbs served as a flight surgeon on NASA’s Project Gemini. He was a doctor in Brevard County, Florida, and worked in the emergency department at the Tallahassee Memorial Hospital. He was credited as one of the creators of the sports drink Gatorade, along with four other people at the University of Florida.

In 1970, Tubbs was elected for the 72nd district of the Florida House of Representatives. He then represented the 45th district from 1972 to 1974. In the same year, he moved to Tallahassee, Florida.

In 1970 Tubbs sued the Stokely-Van Camp Company for $2 million as his share of the royalties from the development of Gatorade. The claim was later reduced to $9,000.

Tubbs died in July 1978 in a plane crash in Lake City, Florida, at the age of 42, along with his wife, Caroline.

References 

1935 births
1978 deaths
People from Dania Beach, Florida
Republican Party members of the Florida House of Representatives
20th-century American politicians
American physicians
20th-century American physicians
Accidental deaths in Florida
Victims of aviation accidents or incidents in 1978
Victims of aviation accidents or incidents in the United States